Babarud (also Romanized as Bābārūd) is a village in Torkaman Rural District of the Central District of Urmia County, West Azerbaijan province, Iran. At the 2006 National Census, its population was 615 in 125 households. The following census in 2011 counted 647 people in 164 households. The latest census in 2016 showed a population of 634 people in 181 households; it was the largest village in its rural district.

References 

Urmia County

Populated places in West Azerbaijan Province

Populated places in Urmia County